A Parcel of Rogues is an album by The Dubliners, released through the Polydor label in 1976. It featured Barney McKenna, Luke Kelly, John Sheahan and Jim McCann.

Track listing

Side One
All songs trad. (arranged by The Dubliners for Squirrel Music), except where noted.
 "Spanish Lady"
 "The Foggy Dew"
 "Kid on the Mountain"
 "Avondale"
 "The Acrobat/Village Bells"
 "The Blantyre Explosion"

Side Two
 "False Hearted Lover"
 "Thirty Foot Trailer" (Ewan McColl; Harmony Music)
 "Boulavogue"
 "Doherty's Reel/Down the Broom/Honeymoon Reel"
 "Parcel of Rogues"
 "Killieburn Brae"

References

The Dubliners albums
1976 albums
Polydor Records albums